Striginiana agrippa is a moth of the  family Eupterotidae. It can be found in Tanzania.

The forewings are yellowish-brown.

References

Moths described in 1909
Janinae